Leanne Ross (born 8 July 1981) is a Former Scottish women's football midfielder and current Head Coach of Glasgow City, having previously being interim head coach after Eileen Gleeson stepped down in December 2022. She played for Glasgow City, between 2007 and 2021.

Between her debut in 2006 and her retirement from international duties in 2017, Ross amassed 133 caps for Scotland.

Club career
Ross grew up in Stenhousemuir and played on boys' teams before, at the age of 15, scoring a record 56 goals in one season for Falkirk Girls. Prior to joining Glasgow City in 2007, Ross spent nine years with Newburgh – who later folded.

Ross won a full set of domestic medals with Glasgow City, and also featured in the UEFA Women's Champions League.

International career
Ross made two appearances for the Scotland under-19 team before a broken ankle derailed her progress at international level. After a lengthy absence, she was surprised to be drafted into the senior team – at left back – for a 1–0 World Cup qualifying win over Switzerland at McDiarmid Park in April 2006.

Ross became a national team regular and won her 50th cap against the same opposition in June 2010. She retired from international football in August 2017.

International goals
Results list Scotland's goal tally first.

Personal life
A childhood Celtic supporter, Ross is employed as an 'active schools co-ordinator' in Clackmannanshire.

See also
 List of women's footballers with 100 or more caps
 Scottish FA Women's International Roll of Honour

References

External links
Leanne Ross at Glasgow City FC
Leanne Ross at FIFA.com

1981 births
Living people
Scottish women's footballers
Scotland women's international footballers
FA Women's National League players
Glasgow City F.C. players
FIFA Century Club
Women's association football midfielders
Footballers from Falkirk
UEFA Women's Euro 2017 players